Imran Aslam may refer to:
 Imran Aslam (actor) (born 1981), Pakistani television actor
 Imran Aslam (journalist), Pakistani journalist and media personality